Kumgang fat minnow (Phoxinus kumgangensis) is a species of freshwater fish in the family Cyprinidae. It is endemic to the Korean peninsula.

References

Phoxinus
Fish described in 1980
Fish of Korea